Chip Jackson is an American jazz double bass player. He has played in trios with Billy Taylor and Elvin Jones.

Discography
With Al Di Meola
Soaring Through a Dream (Manhattan, 1985)
With Teddy Edwards
Ladies Man (HighNote, 2000)
With Danny Gottlieb
Whirlwind (Atlantic, 1989)
With Elvin Jones
Live at the Village Vanguard Volume One (Landmark, 1984)
In Europe (Enja, 1991)
With Jack Walrath
Wholly Trinity (Muse, 1986 [1988])
With Joe Beck The Journey(DMP 1991)

References

American jazz double-bassists
Male double-bassists
Living people
21st-century double-bassists
21st-century American male musicians
American male jazz musicians
Year of birth missing (living people)